is a Japanese actress from Tottori Prefecture. She portrayed Airi Nogami in the tokusatsu drama Kamen Rider Den-O.

Filmography

Films
 Kamen Rider × Kamen Rider × Kamen Rider The Movie: Cho-Den-O Trilogy (2010)
 Pecoross' Mother and Her Days (2013)
 Gonin Saga (2015)
 A Cappella (2016)
 The Crawler In The Attic (2016)
 Carenin (2017), Natsumi Satō
 Gukoroku: Traces of Sin (2017)
 Marriage (2017), Mana Yoshioka
 Cafe Funiculi Funicula (2018), Nagare Tokita
 This Old Road: Konomichi (2019), Toshiko Matsushita
 Peer (2019), Natsumi Satō
 The Flowers of Evil (2019)
 His (2020)
 Love and the Grand Tug-of-war (2021)
 Pornographer: Playback (2021)
 The Blue Skies at Your Feet (2022)
 Marriage Counselor (2023), Yui Tokita
 Minna Ikiteiru (2023), Michiko Sakurai

Television
 Kamen Rider Den-O (TV Asahi, 2007), Airi Nogami
 Around 40 (TBS, 2008) 
 Keishicho Sosa Ikka 9 Gakari 4 (TV Asahi, 2009, ep 1) 
 Untouchable (TV Asahi, 2009, ep 5) 
 Detective Conan Season 1 (YTV, 2011, ep 4)
 Kamen Rider Wizard (TV Asahi, 2012, ep 6-7)
 Legal High (Fuji TV, 2012, ep 3)
 Lucky Seven (Fuji TV, 2012, ep 1)
 Omoni Naitemasu (Fuji TV, 2012, ep 2)
 Tales of the Unusual: Spring 2012 (Fuji TV, 2012, ep 3 "Kazoku (Kari)")
 Awaiting Kirin (NHK, 2020), Odai no Kata
 Fishbowl Wives (Netflix, 2022), Hisako Taguchi
 Don't Call It Mystery (Fuji TV, 2022, ep11), Toake Nekota
 Modern Love Tokyo (Amazon Prime Video, 2022, ep1)
 Involvement in Family Affairs (Fuji TV, 2022), Mihoko Miyama

References

External links
Office profile
"My Color Blog" - personal blog

1984 births
Actors from Tottori Prefecture
Living people
Japanese actresses